Crossroads is an unincorporated community located in Wayne County, Tennessee.

References

Unincorporated communities in Wayne County, Tennessee
Unincorporated communities in Tennessee